Slatina nad Bebravou is a village and municipality in the Bánovce nad Bebravou District of  the Trenčín Region of Slovakia.

In 2018, archaeologists discovered relief-decorated shoulder boards made from bronze that were part of a breastplate of a Greek warrior at a Celtic sacrificial place near the village. Deputy of director of Slovak Archaeological Institute said that it is the oldest original Greek art relic in the area of Slovakia. Researchers analyzed the pieces, and determined they were once part of a relief that depicted the Amazonomachy.

References

External links
  Official page

Villages and municipalities in Bánovce nad Bebravou District